Yemassee station is an Amtrak train stop in Yemassee, South Carolina.  Located at 15 Wall Street (erroneously listed as 9 Main Street on the Amtrak timetable and the Amtrak official website), the station consists of a covered platform on the northwest side of the northeast-southwest tracks, a small parking lot, and a building.  The building is mostly boarded up, but it does have a small waiting room for Amtrak passengers. It also contains a freight depot. Both the station and the freight house were originally built by the Charleston and Western Carolina Railway.  The current station house was built around 1955 as a replacement for several other stations in the past. The station was later run by the Atlantic Coast Line Railroad.

Yemassee is served by the Palmetto and Silver Meteor trains of Amtrak's Silver Service.  Both trains pass through Yemassee, near the growing towns of Beaufort and Hilton Head, at roughly the same times of the day; the northbound Palmetto and southbound Silver Meteor do so in the morning, while the southbound Palmetto and northbound Silver Meteor come through in the evening.

From 1915 to 1965, the Yemassee station was the first place where potential United States Marines recruits stopped before reaching Marine Corps Recruit Depot Parris Island. Many Marines that fought in wars and conflicts spanning World War I through Vietnam began their careers at the train station.

The town is in the process of purchasing the station from Amtrak as part of a local revitalization effort.

Image gallery

References

External links

Yemassee Amtrak Station (USA Rail Guide – Train Web)
Yemassee ACL/C&WC Depot (South Carolina Railroad Structures)

Amtrak stations in South Carolina
Buildings and structures in Beaufort County, South Carolina
Y
Transportation in Beaufort County, South Carolina